John Beaumont (by 1508 – between 1558 and 1564), of Thringstone and Gracedieu, Leicestershire and London, was an English politician.

He was a Member (MP) of the Parliament of England for Leicester in 1539 and 1542, Bossiney in April 1554, and Liverpool in November 1554 and 1555.

References

Year of birth missing
16th-century deaths
Members of the Parliament of England (pre-1707) for Liverpool
People from Thringstone
Members of the pre-1707 English Parliament for constituencies in Cornwall
English MPs 1539–1540
English MPs 1542–1544
English MPs 1554
English MPs 1554–1555
English MPs 1555
Politicians from Leicestershire